A hackney or hackney carriage (also called a cab, black cab, hack or London taxi) is a carriage or car for hire. A hackney of a more expensive or high class was called a remise. A symbol of London and Britain, the black taxi is a common sight on the streets of the UK. The hackney carriages carry a roof sign TAXI that can be illuminated at night to indicate their availability for passengers.

In the UK, the name hackney carriage today refers to a taxicab licensed by the Public Carriage Office, local authority (non-metropolitan district councils, unitary authorities) or the Department of the Environment depending on region of the country.

In the United States, the police department of the city of Boston has a Hackney Carriage Unit, analogous to taxicab regulators in other cities, that issues Hackney Carriage medallions to its taxi operators.

Etymology
The origins of the word hackney in connection with horses and carriages are uncertain. The origin is often attributed to the London borough of Hackney, whose name likely originated in Old English meaning 'Haka's Island'. There is some doubt whether the word for a horse was derived from this place-name, as the area was historically marshy and not well-suited for keeping horses. The American Hackney Horse Society favours an alternative etymology stemming from the French word haquenée—a horse of medium size recommended for lady riders—which was brought to England with the Norman Conquest and became fully assimilated into the English language by the start of the 14th century. The word became associated with an ambling horse, usually for hire.

The place-name, through its famous association with horses and horse-drawn carriages, is also the root of the Spanish word jaca, a term used for a small breed of horse and the Sardinian achetta horse. The first documented hackney coach—the name later extended to the newer and smaller carriages—operated in London in 1621.

The New York City colloquial terms "hack" (taxi or taxi-driver), hackstand (taxi stand), and hack license (taxi licence) are probably derived from hackney carriage. Such cabs are now regulated by the New York City Taxi and Limousine Commission.

History
"An Ordinance for the Regulation of Hackney-Coachmen in London and the places adjacent" was approved by Parliament in 1654, to remedy what it described as the "many Inconveniences [that] do daily arise by reason of the late increase and great irregularity of Hackney Coaches and Hackney Coachmen in London, Westminster and the places thereabouts". The first hackney-carriage licences date from a 1662 Act of Parliament establishing the Commissioners of Scotland Yard to regulate them. Licences applied literally to horse-drawn carriages, later modernised as hansom cabs (1834), that operated as vehicles for hire. The 1662 act limited the licences to 400; when it expired in 1679, extra licences were created until a 1694 act imposed a limit of 700, which was increased by later acts and abolished in 1832.

There was a distinction between a general hackney carriage and a hackney coach, a hireable vehicle with specifically four wheels, two horses and six seats, and driven by a Jarvey (also spelled jarvie).

In 19th century London, private carriages were commonly sold off for use as hackney carriages, often displaying painted-over traces of the previous owner's coat of arms on the doors.

The Clarence or growler was a type of four-wheel, enclosed carriage drawn by two horses used as a hackney carriage, that is, as a vehicle for hire with a coachman. It is distinguished from a cab, hansom cab or cabriolet, in that those had only two wheels. It is distinguished from most coaches by being of slightly smaller size, nominally holding four passengers, and being much less ostentatious.

A small, usually two-wheeled, one-horse hackney vehicle called a noddy once plied the roads in Ireland and Scotland. The French had a small hackney coach called a fiacre.

Motorisation

Electric hackney carriages appeared before the introduction of the internal combustion engine to vehicles for hire in 1897. In fact there was even London Electrical Cab Company: the cabs were informally called Berseys after the manager who designed them, Walter Bersey. Another nickname was Hummingbirds from the sound that they made. In August 1897, 25 were introduced, and by 1898, there were 50 more. During the early 20th century, cars generally replaced horse-drawn models. In 1910, the number of motor cabs on London streets outnumbered horse-drawn growlers and hansoms for the first time. At the time of the outbreak of World War I, the ratio was seven to one in favor of motorized cabs. The last horse-drawn hackney carriage ceased service in London in 1947.

UK regulations define a hackney carriage as a taxicab allowed to ply the streets looking for passengers to pick up, as opposed to private hire vehicles (sometimes called minicabs), which may pick up only passengers who have previously booked or who visit the taxi operator's office. In 1999, the first of a series of fuel cell powered taxis were tried out in London. The "Millennium Cab" built by ZeTek gained television coverage and great interest when driven in the Sheraton Hotel ballroom in New York by Judd Hirsch, the star of the television series Taxi. ZeTek built three cabs but ceased activities in 2001.

Continuing horse-drawn cab services

Horse-drawn hackney services continue to operate in parts of the UK, for example in Cockington, Torquay. The town of Windsor, Berkshire, is believed to be the last remaining town with a continuous lineage of horse-drawn hackney carriages, currently run by Orchard Poyle Carriages, the licence having been passed down from driver to driver since 1830.

The Royal Borough now licences the carriage for rides around Windsor Castle and the Great Park; however, the original hackney licence is in place, allowing for passenger travel under the same law that was originally passed in 1662. The city of Bath has an occasional horse-drawn Hackney, principally for tourists, but still carrying hackney plates.

Black cabs

Though there has never been law requiring London's taxis to be black, they were, since the end of the Second World War, sold in a standard colour of black. This, in the 1970s gave rise within the minicab trade to the nickname 'black cab' and it has become common currency. However, before Second World War, London's cabs were seen in a variety of colours. They are produced in a variety of colours, sometimes in advertising brand liveries (see below). Fifty golden cabs were produced for the Queen's Golden Jubilee celebrations in 2002.

Vehicle design
In Edwardian times, French-manufactured automobiles represented the overwhelming majority of London's motor cab trade, with Renault and Unic being the most common. Not only Renault and Unic, but also smaller players like Charron and Darracq were to be found. Fiat was also a presence, with their importer d'Arcy Baker running a fleet of 400 cars of the brand. In the 1920s, Beardmore cabs were introduced and became for a while the most popular. They were nicknamed 'the Rolls-Royce of cabs' for their comfort and robustness. The American Yellow Cabs also appeared, though only in small numbers. Maxwell Monson introduced Citroën cabs, which were cheaper, but crude in comparison to the Beardmore. In 1930 dealers Mann and Overton struck a deal with the  Austin to bring modified version of the Austin 12/4 car to the London taxi market. This established the Austin make as dominant until the end of the 1970s and Mann and Overton until 2012. Morrises  cabs were also seen, in small numbers, but after the Second World War, produced the Oxford, made by Wolseleys,

Outside of London, the regulations governing the hackney cab trade are different. Four-door saloon cars have been highly popular as hackney carriages, but with disability regulations growing in strength and some councils offering free licensing for disabled-friendly vehicles, many operators are now opting for wheelchair-adapted taxis such as the LEVC TX of London Electric Vehicle Company (LEVC). London taxis have broad rear doors that open very wide (or slide), and an electrically controlled ramp that is extended for access. Other models of specialist taxis include the Peugeot E7 and rivals from Fiat, Ford, Volkswagen, and Mercedes-Benz. These vehicles normally allow six or seven passengers, although some models can accommodate eight. Some of these minibus taxis include a front passenger seat next to the driver, while others reserve this space solely for luggage.

One reason for this is the configuration of the famed Savoy Hotel: the hotel entrance's small roundabout meant that vehicles needed the small turning circle in order to navigate it. That requirement became the legally required turning circles for all London cabs, while the custom of a passenger's sitting on the right, behind the driver, provided a reason for the right-hand traffic in Savoy Court, allowing hotel patrons to board and alight from the driver's side.

The design standards for London taxis are set out in the Conditions of Fitness, which are now published by Transport for London. The first edition was published in May 1906, by the Public Carriage Office, which was then part of the Metropolitan Police. These regulations set out the conditions under which a taxi may operate and have been updated over the years to keep pace with motor car development and legislation. Until the beginning of the 1980s, London Taxis were not allowed to carry any advertisements. The London Taxis fleet has been fully accessible since 1 January 2000, following the introduction of the first accessible taxi in 1987.

As part of the Transported by Design programme of activities, on 15 October 2015, after two months of public voting, the black cab was elected by Londoners as their favourite transport design icon.

Driver qualification
In London, hackney-carriage drivers have to pass a test called The Knowledge to demonstrate that they have an intimate knowledge of the geography of London streets, important buildings, etc. Learning The Knowledge allows the driver to become a member of the Worshipful Company of Hackney Carriage Drivers. There are two types of badge, a yellow one for the suburban areas and a green one for all of London. The latter is considered far more difficult. Drivers who own their cabs as opposed to renting from a garage are known as "mushers" and those who have just passed the "knowledge" are known as "butter boys". There are currently around 21,000 black cabs in London, licensed by the Public Carriage Office.

Elsewhere, councils have their own regulations. Some merely require a driver to pass a DBS disclosure and have a reasonably clean driving licence, while others use their own local versions of London's The Knowledge test.

Notable drivers
Alfred Collins, who retired in 2007 at the age of 92, was the oldest cab driver and had been driving for 70 years. 
Fred Housego is a former London taxi driver who became a television and radio personality and presenter after winning the BBC television quiz Mastermind in 1980. 
Clive Efford, Labour MP for the London constituency of Eltham, was a cab driver for 10 years before entering parliament in 1997.

Private users
Oil millionaire Nubar Gulbenkian owned an Austin FX3 Brougham Sedanca taxi, with custom coachwork by FLM Panelcraft Ltd as he was quoted "because it turns on a sixpence whatever that is." Gulbenkian had two such taxis built, the second of which was built on an FX4 chassis and was sold at auction by Bonhams for $39,600 in 2015. Other celebrities are known to have used hackney carriages both for their anonymity and their ruggedness and manoeuvrability in London traffic. Users included Prince Philip, whose cab was converted to run on liquefied petroleum gas, author and actor Stephen Fry, and the Sheriffs of the City of London. A black cab was used in the band Oasis's video for the song "Don't Look Back in Anger." Black cabs were used as recording studios for indie band performances and other performances in the Black Cab Sessions internet project.

Ghosthunting With... featured a black cab owned by host of the show, Yvette Fielding. Bez of the Happy Mondays owns one, shown on the UK edition of Pimp My Ride. Noel Edmonds used a black cab to commute from his home to the Deal or No Deal studios in Bristol.  He placed a dressed mannequin in the back so that he could use special bus/taxi lanes, and so that people would not attempt to hail his cab.

The official car of the Governor of the Falkland Islands between 1976 and 2010 was a London taxi.

In other countries

Between 2003 and 1 August 2009 the London taxi model TXII could be purchased in the United States. Today there are approximately 250 TXIIs in the US, operating as taxis in San Francisco, Dallas, Long Beach, Houston, New Orleans, Las Vegas, Newport, Rhode Island, Wilmington, North Carolina and Portland, Oregon. There are also a few operating in Ottawa, Ontario, Canada. The largest London taxi rental fleet in North America is in Wilmington, owned by The British Taxi Company. There are London cabs in Saudi Arabia, Romania, South Africa, Lebanon, Egypt, Bahrain and Cyprus, and in Israel, where a Chinese-made version of LTI's model TX4 built by Geely Automobile is available. In February 2010, a number of TX4s started operating in Pristina, the capital of Kosovo, and are known as London Taxi.

Singapore has used London-style cabs since 1992; starting with the "Fairway". The flag-down fares for the London Taxis are the same as for other taxis. SMRT Corporation, the sole operator, had by March 2013 replaced its fleet of 15 ageing multi-coloured (gold, pink, etc.) taxis with new white ones. They are the only wheelchair-accessible taxis in Singapore, and were brought back following an outcry after the removal of the service.

By 2011 a thousand of a Chinese-made version of LTI's latest model, TX4, had been ordered by Baku Taxi Company. The plan is part of a program originally announced by Azerbaijan's Ministry of Transportation to introduce London cabs to the capital, Baku. The move was part of a £16 million agreement between the London Taxi Company and Baku Taxi Company.

Although the LEVC TX is more expensive and exceeds the Japanese size classifications to gain the tax advantages Japanese livery drivers enjoy with the similarly designed but smaller Toyota JPN Taxi, Geely has attempted to break into the Japanese market. Alternatively, while the Toyota JPN Taxi doesn't meet the passenger capacity or turning radius Conditions of Fitness required by Transport for London, it does meet the emissions and accessibility requirements that may make it an ideal option for cities outside of London without the seating requirements or as a private hire vehicle while still evoking the familiar black cab profile.

Variety of models
There have been different makes and types of hackney cab through the years, including:
 Mann & Overton - including Carbodies, The London Taxi Company and currently London EV Company 
 Unic sold in London from 1906 to 1930s
 Austin London Taxicab
 Austin FX3
 Austin/Carbodies/LTI FX4 and Fairway
 LTI TX1, TXII and TX4
 LEVC TX (plug-in hybrid range-extender)
 Mercedes-Benz
 Vito W639
Morris
 Nuffield Oxford Taxi
 London General Cab Co.
 Citroën
 Beardmore
 Beardmore Marks I to VII
 Metrocab (originally formed by Metro Cammell Weymann)
 MCW/Reliant/Hooper Metrocab
 Dynamo Motor Company
 Dynamo Taxi(Nissan NV200 based)

Use in advertising

The unique body of the London taxi is occasionally wrapped with all-over advertising, known as a "livery".

In October 2011 the company Eyetease Ltd. introduced digital screens on the roofs of London taxis for dynamically changing location-specific advertising.

Future
On 14 December 2010, Mayor of London Boris Johnson released an air quality strategy paper encouraging phasing out of the oldest of the LT cabs, and proposing a £1m fund to encourage taxi owners to upgrade to low-emission vehicles. From 2018, all newly licensed taxis in London must be zero emission capable.

In 2017, the LEVC TX was introduced - a purpose built hackney carriage, built as a plug-in hybrid range-extender electric vehicle. By April 2022, over 5,000 TX's had been sold in London, around a third of London's taxi fleet. In October 2019 the first fully electric cab since the Bersey in 1897, the Dynamo Taxi, was launched with a 187-mile range and with the bodywork based on Nissan's NV200 platform.

Digital hailing
2011 saw the launch of many digital hailing applications for hackney carriages that operate through smartphones, including GetTaxi and Hailo. Many of these applications also facilitate payment and tracking of the taxicabs.

United Kingdom law 
Laws about the definition, licensing and operation of hackney carriages have a long history. The most significant pieces of legislation by region are:

 In England and Wales: the Town Police Clauses Act 1847, and the Local Government (Miscellaneous Provisions) Act 1976. In Wales, responsibility for licensing is now devolved to the National Assembly for Wales. In September 2017, a consultation started about the future of such licensing.
 In London: the Metropolitan Public Carriage Act 1869 and the London Cab Order 1934.
 In Scotland: the Civic Government (Scotland) Act 1982.
 In Northern Ireland: the Taxis Act (Northern Ireland) 2008

See also
 Cabmen's Shelter Fund
 Cabvision
 Illegal taxicab operation
 M4 bus lane
 Toyota JPN Taxi
 VPG Standard Taxi
 Wagon
 Black Cab Rapist, a black cab driver who raped women in his black cab

References

External links

 Fairway Owners Club and Forum
 Taxi fare calculator based on fares set by local authorities
 Taxis and private hire Transport for London Public Carriage Office
 London hackney coach regulations, 1819. Genealogy UK Genealogy and Family History.

Carriages
Taxi vehicles
Taxis of London